This is a list of 147 species in Neoempheria, a genus of fungus gnats in the family Mycetophilidae.

Neoempheria species

 Neoempheria acracanthia Wu & Yang, 1995 c g
 Neoempheria amphiphaea Speiser, 1909 c g
 Neoempheria amurensis Zaitzev, 1994 c g
 Neoempheria anjouana Matile, 1979 c g
 Neoempheria aperta Zaitzev & Menzel, 1996 c g
 Neoempheria apicalis Kertesz, 1909 c g
 Neoempheria appendiculata Matile, 1973 c g
 Neoempheria balioptera (Loew, 1869) i c g b
 Neoempheria basalis (Brunetti, 1912) c g
 Neoempheria beijingana Wu & Yang, 1993 c g
 Neoempheria biceltisuta  g
 Neoempheria bidentata Coher, 1959 c g
 Neoempheria bifascipennis (Brunetti, 1912) c g
 Neoempheria bifida Coher, 1959 c g
 Neoempheria biflagellata Edwards, 1940 c g
 Neoempheria bifurcata  g
 Neoempheria bilobata Edwards, 1940 c g
 Neoempheria bimaculata (Roser, 1840) c g
 Neoempheria bipectinata Edwards, 1940 c g
 Neoempheria bisecuriata  g
 Neoempheria bispinosa Sasakawa, 2005 c g
 Neoempheria borgmeieri Edwards, 1940 c g
 Neoempheria boubya Matile, 1973 c g
 Neoempheria bradleyi Edwards, 1940 c g
 Neoempheria brasiliensis Coher, 1959 c g
 Neoempheria brevicauda Edwards, 1940 c g
 Neoempheria brevilineata Okada, 1939 c g
 Neoempheria brevispathulata  g
 Neoempheria carinata  g
 Neoempheria caudalis (Edwards, 1931) c g
 Neoempheria cincta Shaw, 1940 c g
 Neoempheria comes Coher, 1959 c g
 Neoempheria costalimai Edwards, 1940 c g
 Neoempheria costaricensis Coher, 1959 c g
 Neoempheria cotyla Sasakawa, 2005 c g
 Neoempheria cuneata  g
 Neoempheria cyphia Wu & Yang, 1995 c g
 Neoempheria defectiva (Edwards, 1931) c g
 Neoempheria defleta Coher, 1959 c g
 Neoempheria denticulata  g
 Neoempheria didyma Loew, 1869 i c g
 Neoempheria dilatata  g
 Neoempheria dizonalis (Edwards, 1931) c g
 Neoempheria donskoffi Matile, 1973 c g
 Neoempheria dziedzickii Coher, 1959 c g
 Neoempheria echinata Wu & Yang, 1995 c g
 Neoempheria ecuadorensis Coher, 1959 c g
 Neoempheria ediya Matile, 1973 c g
 Neoempheria enderleini Edwards, 1940 c g
 Neoempheria evanescens Enderlein, 1910 c g
 Neoempheria faceta Coher, 1959 c g
 Neoempheria fallax Coher, 1959 c g
 Neoempheria ferruginea (Brunetti, 1912) c
 Neoempheria flavicornis Edwards, 1940 c g
 Neoempheria flavicoxa Edwards, 1940 c g
 Neoempheria flavida Matile, 1973 c g
 Neoempheria forficulata  g
 Neoempheria formosensis Lynch Arribalzaga, 1892 c g
 Neoempheria fujiana Yang & Wu, 1991 c g
 Neoempheria gainesvillensis Khalaf, 1971 i c g
 Neoempheria glochis Coher, 1959 c g
 Neoempheria goiana Coher, 1959 c g
 Neoempheria griseipennis Strobl, 1910 c g
 Neoempheria horrens Coher, 1959 c g
 Neoempheria illustris Johannsen, 1910 i c g b
 Neoempheria impatiens Johannsen, 1910 i c g
 Neoempheria indulgens Johannsen, 1910 i c g
 Neoempheria insignis (Winnertz, 1863) c g
 Neoempheria jamaicensis Coher, 1961 c g
 Neoempheria jeanneli Edwards, 1914 c g
 Neoempheria jilinana Wu & Yang, 1993 c g
 Neoempheria johannseni (Enderlein, 1910) c g
 Neoempheria jugalis Coher, 1959 c g
 Neoempheria kaestneri Edwards, 1940 c g
 Neoempheria lanei Edwards, 1940 c g
 Neoempheria larifuga Coher, 1959 c g
 Neoempheria latisternata  g
 Neoempheria levir Coher, 1959 c g
 Neoempheria lindneri Edwards, 1940 c g
 Neoempheria lineola (Meigen, 1818) c g
 Neoempheria longiseta Coher, 1959 c g
 Neoempheria luederwaldti Edwards, 1940 c g
 Neoempheria lutzi Edwards, 1940 c g
 Neoempheria macularis Johannsen, 1910 i c g b
 Neoempheria maculipennis Williston, 1896 c g
 Neoempheria magna Wu & Yang, 1993 c g
 Neoempheria medialis (Edwards, 1931) c g
 Neoempheria merogena Yang & Wu, 1993 c g
 Neoempheria mirabila Wu & Yang, 1995 c g
 Neoempheria moheliana Matile, 1979 c g
 Neoempheria monticola Wu, 1999 c g
 Neoempheria muelleri Edwards, 1940 c g
 Neoempheria muticata  g
 Neoempheria neivai Edwards, 1940 c g
 Neoempheria nepticula (Loew, 1869) i c g
 Neoempheria ombrophila Matile & Delobel, 1976 c g
 Neoempheria ornata Okada, 1938 c g
 Neoempheria ornatipennis (Enderlein, 1910) c g
 Neoempheria panamensis Coher, 1959 c g
 Neoempheria paulensis Coher, 1959 c g
 Neoempheria pereirai Edwards, 1940 c g
 Neoempheria pervulgata Wu, 1995 c g
 Neoempheria philipsi Shaw, 1951 c g
 Neoempheria pictipennis (Haliday, 1833) c g
 Neoempheria pilosa Edwards, 1940 c g
 Neoempheria platycera Wu, 1995 c g
 Neoempheria plaumanni Edwards, 1940 c g
 Neoempheria pleurotivora Sasakawa, 1979 c g
 Neoempheria portoricensis Coher, 1959 c g
 Neoempheria propinqua (Meijere, 1907) c g
 Neoempheria proxima (Winnertz, 1863) c g
 Neoempheria puncticoxa Edwards, 1940 c g
 Neoempheria rabelloi Coher, 1959 c g
 Neoempheria rostrata Edwards, 1940 c g
 Neoempheria sakhalinensis Zaitzev, 2001 c g
 Neoempheria separata Coher, 1959 c g
 Neoempheria setulosa Wu, 1999 c g
 Neoempheria shannoni Edwards, 1940 c g
 Neoempheria signifera Skuse, 1890 c g
 Neoempheria simplex Edwards, 1940 c g
 Neoempheria sinica Wu & Yang, 1993 c g
 Neoempheria smarti Edwards, 1940 c g
 Neoempheria socia Coher, 1959 c g
 Neoempheria spinosa Edwards, 1940 c g
 Neoempheria striata (Meigen, 1818) c g
 Neoempheria stubbsi Sevcik & Papp, 2003 c g
 Neoempheria subclavata Edwards, 1940 c g
 Neoempheria subfallax Coher, 1959 c g
 Neoempheria subhorrens Coher, 1959 c g
 Neoempheria sublevir Coher, 1959 c g
 Neoempheria subproxima Zaitzev, 2001 c g
 Neoempheria subulata Wu & Yang, 1995 c g
 Neoempheria tarsata (Winnertz, 1863) c g
 Neoempheria tetraphaea Shaw, 1940 c g
 Neoempheria tinctipennis (Brunetti, 1912) c g
 Neoempheria transvaalensis Vaisanen, 1994 c g
 Neoempheria triloba Wu & Yang, 1995 c g
 Neoempheria tropica (Doleschall, 1857) c g
 Neoempheria tuomikoskii Vaisanen, 1982 c g
 Neoempheria unifascipennis (Senior-White, 1922) c g
 Neoempheria unispinosa Edwards, 1940 c g
 Neoempheria varipennis Lynch Arribalzaga, 1892 c g
 Neoempheria vicina Colless, 1966 c g
 Neoempheria vogeli Edwards, 1940 c g
 Neoempheria wangi Yang & Wu, 1993 c g
 Neoempheria winnertzi Edwards, 1913 c g
 Neoempheria zeteki Coher, 1959 c g

Data sources: i = ITIS, c = Catalogue of Life, g = GBIF, b = Bugguide.net

References

Neoempheria
Articles created by Qbugbot